Qarah Chay-ye Hajj Ali (also Romanized as Qarah Chāy-e Ḩājjī ‘Alī and Qareh Chāy-e Ḩājjī ‘Alī) is a village in Sahandabad Rural District of Tekmeh Dash District, Bostanabad County, East Azerbaijan province, Iran. At the 2006 census, its population was 508 in 103 households. The following census in 2011 counted 424 people in 122 households. The latest census in 2016 showed a population of 407 people in 104 households; it was the largest village in its rural district.

References 

Bostanabad County

Populated places in East Azerbaijan Province

Populated places in Bostanabad County